Bruceville can refer to a place in the United States:
Bruceville, Indiana
Bruceville-Eddy, Texas